Roundabout homolog 1 is a protein that in humans is encoded by the ROBO1 gene.

Function 

Bilateral symmetric nervous systems have special midline structures that establish a partition between the two mirror image halves. Some axons project toward and across the midline in response to long-range chemoattractants emanating from the midline.  The protein encoded by ROBO1 is structurally similar to a Drosophila integral membrane protein which is encoded by the Drosophila roundabout gene (a member of the immunoglobulin gene superfamily) and is both an axon guidance receptor and a cell adhesion receptor, known to be involved in the decision by axons to cross the central nervous system midline.  Two transcript variants encoding different isoforms have been found for ROBO1.

Clinical significance 

ROBO1 was implicated in a communication disorder based on a Finnish pedigree with severe dyslexia. Analyses revealed a translocation had occurred disrupting ROBO1. Study of the  phonological memory component of  the language acquisition system suggests that ROBO1 polymorphisms are associated with functioning  in this system. The gene is thought to be related to the brain's ability to represent quantities, and is correlated with better math scores of young children in one limited study.

References

Further reading